An ice hockey rink is an ice rink that is specifically designed for ice hockey, a competitive team sport. Alternatively it is used for other sports such as broomball, ringette, rinkball, and rink bandy.

Name origins 
Rink, a Scots word meaning 'course', was used as the name of a place where another game, curling, was played. Early in its history, ice hockey was played mostly on rinks constructed for curling. The name was retained after hockey-specific facilities were built.

Dimensions 
There are two standard sizes for hockey rinks: one used primarily in North America, also known as NHL size, the other used in Europe and international competitions, also known as IIHF or Olympic size.

International 

North American 
The 13.6 ft difference in width from the international standard represents a significant difference in width-to-length ratio on the ice.

Origins 
The rink specifications originate from the ice surface of the Victoria Skating Rink in Montreal, constructed in 1862, where the first indoor game was played in 1875. Its ice surface measured . The curved corners are said to originate from the design of the Montreal Arena, constructed in 1898.

Markings

Lines 
The centre line separates the ice in half crosswise. It is used to judge icing. It is a thick line, and in the NHL must "contain regular interval markings of a uniform distinctive design, which will readily distinguish it from the two blue lines." It may also be used to judge two-line pass violations in leagues that use such a rule. 

There are two thick blue lines that divide the rink into three parts, called zones. These two lines are used to judge if a player is offside. If an attacking player crosses the line into the other team's zone before the puck does, he is said to be offside.

Near each end of the rink, there is a thin red goal line spanning the width of the ice. It is used to judge goals and icing calls.

Faceoff spots and circles 
There are 9 faceoff spots on a hockey rink. All faceoffs take place at these spots. There are two spots in each team's defensive zone, two at each end of the neutral zone, and one in the centre of the rink.

There are faceoff circles around the centre ice and end zone faceoff spots. There are hash marks painted on the ice near the end zone faceoff spots. The circles and hash marks show where players may legally position themselves during a faceoff or during in-game play.

Spot and circle dimensions 
Both the centre faceoff spot and centre faceoff circle are blue.

All of the other faceoff spots and circles are colored red. Within the spot, two red vertical lines are drawn  from the left and right inner edges, and the area between these lines is painted red while the rest of the circle is painted white.

Goal posts and nets 
At each end of the ice, there is a goal consisting of a metal goal frame and cloth net in which each team must place the puck to score. According to NHL and IIHF rules, the entire puck must cross the entire goal line in order to be counted as a goal.

Crease 
The crease is a special area of the ice in front of each goal that is designed to allow the goaltender to perform without interference.

This area is typically coloured blue for easier visibility.

Goaltender trapezoid ("Martin Brodeur" Rule) 

During the 2004–05 American Hockey League (AHL) season, an experimental rule was implemented for the first seven weeks of the season, instituting a goaltender trap zone, more commonly called the trapezoid in reference to its shape. Under the rule, it is prohibited for the goaltender to handle the puck anywhere behind the goal line that is not within the trapezoidal area. If they do so they are assessed a minor penalty for delay of game.

The motivation for the introduction of the trapezoid was to promote game flow and prolonged offensive attacks by making it more difficult for the goaltender to possess and clear the puck. The rule was aimed at reducing the effectiveness of goaltenders with good puck-handling abilities, such as Martin Brodeur for whom the rule is nicknamed.

The area consists of a centred, symmetrical trapezoid. The bases of the trapezoid are formed by the goal line and the end boards.

The seven-week experiment proved so successful that the AHL moved to enforce the rule for the rest of the season, and then was approved by the NHL when play resumed for the 2005–06 season following the previous lockout. The ECHL, the only other developmental league in the Professional Hockey Players Association along with the AHL, also approved the rule for 2005–06.

Referee's crease 
The referee's crease is a semicircle  in radius in front of the scorekeepers bench. Under USA Hockey rule 601(d)(5), any player entering or remaining in the referee's crease while the referee is reporting to or consulting with any game official may be assessed a misconduct penalty. The USA Hockey casebook specifically states that the imposition of such a penalty would be unusual, and the player would typically first be asked to leave the referee's crease before the imposition of the penalty. The NHL has a similar rule, also calling for a misconduct penalty. Traditionally, captains and alternate captains are the only players allowed to approach the referee's crease.

Zones 

The blue lines divide the rink into three zones. The central zone is called the neutral zone or simply centre ice. The generic term for the outer zones is end zones, but they are more commonly referred to by terms relative to each team. The end zone in which a team is trying to score is called the attacking zone or offensive zone; the end zone in which the team's own goal net is located is called the defending zone or defensive zone.

The blue line is considered part of whichever zone the puck is in. Therefore, if the puck is in the neutral zone, the blue line is part of the neutral zone. It must completely cross the blue line to be considered in the end zone. Once the puck is in the end zone, the blue line becomes part of that end zone. The puck must now completely cross the blue line in the other direction to be considered in the neutral zone again.

Boards 
In a hockey rink, the boards are the low wall that form the boundaries of the rink. The "side boards" are the boards along the two long sides of the rink. The half boards are the boards halfway between the goal line and blue line. The sections of the rink located behind each goal are called the "end boards". The boards that are curved (near the ends of the rink) are called the "corner boards".

See also 

Ice hockey arena
Ice hockey rules
National Hockey League rules
Neutral zone trap
Ice rink
Figure skating rink
Speed skating rink

References

External links 

 Backyard Ice Hockey Rinks
 NHL Official Rules: Rule 1 – Rink
 Hockey Rinks Database of 5,500 Rinks in the U.S. and Canada
 Hockey Arenas in Europe

Ice hockey rules
Sports rules and regulations
Ice rinks
Sports venues by type